Steve Augustine (born 11 March 1977 in Road Town, Tortola) is a sprinter who represented the British Virgin Islands.

Augustine represented British Virgin Islands at the Summer Olympics when he competed in the 1996 Summer Olympics in Atlanta, he entered the 4x400 metres relay the team finished 6th in the heat so didn't qualify for the next round.

References

1977 births
Living people
British Virgin Islands male sprinters
Athletes (track and field) at the 1994 Commonwealth Games
Athletes (track and field) at the 2002 Commonwealth Games
Commonwealth Games competitors for the British Virgin Islands
Athletes (track and field) at the 1996 Summer Olympics
Olympic athletes of the British Virgin Islands